HD 4203 b is an exoplanet more massive than Jupiter. It orbits two times further from the star than Earth to the Sun. The planet takes 1.1824 year to orbit the star very eccentrically from 1.00 AU to 3.14 AU. The planet was discovered by Steve Vogt using the Keck telescope.

See also
 HD 4208 b
 HD 4308 b

References

External links
 

Exoplanets discovered in 2001
Giant planets
Pisces (constellation)
Exoplanets detected by radial velocity

de:HD 4203 b